Aulonogyrus obliquus is a species of lady beetle native to India, and Sri Lanka.

Description
It is recorded from Eastern Ghats and North Western Himalaya and Silent Valley in Kerala. 

The species is elongate-ovate with a black color dorsum and ventrum. Head with fine wrinkles and clypeus transverse. Antennae black, stout and short. Pronotum transverse. Elytra apically truncate with margined lateral sides. Scutellum is transverse.

References 

Gyrinidae
Insects of Sri Lanka
Insects of India
Insects described in 1858